Juturna is the debut studio album by American rock band Circa Survive. It was released on April 19, 2005 through Equal Vision Records. Upon the album's release, it debuted on the Billboard 200 at No. 183 on May 7, 2005. Up to July 19, 2006, it had sold 74,896 copies. The album artwork is by Esao Andrews.

Meaning
Juturna is the Roman goddess of fountains, wells and springs and was taken as the album title to symbolize a new beginning for the band's members. It was originally the title of an unreleased song from an early demo of "The Great Golden Baby".

Track listing

Notes
The end of the album has a hidden track. The hidden track begins at 8:56 of "Meet Me in Montauk". In 2005 after the album's release, members of the online message board Circa Board inquired about the song's name. Guitarist Brendan Ekstrom responded, "'Paranoid Flu' or 'House of Leaves' or 'I completely forget what we called it.' or 'Blues'." The track's name was confirmed as "House of Leaves" with the release 10th Anniversary Deluxe Edition of Juturna, which features the song as a demo on its second disc.

The song "Stop the Fuckin' Car" had its name censored to "Stop the Car" on the track listing on the back of the CD case. However, it is listed as "Stop the Fuckin' Car" on the booklet inside the case. The song has also appeared as "Stop the Fucking Car" without the apostrophe. 

"Suspending Disbelief", a song from previous EP The Inuit Sessions, was originally intended to be on Juturna. Musical lead-ins place it between tracks 9 & 10. Its position was restored there on the 10th Anniversary Deluxe Edition of Juturna, bringing the main album to a total of 12 tracks. 

The 10th Anniversary Deluxe Edition also features a second disc with 17 B-Sides and alternate versions.

Cultural references
 The album as a whole and several songs were inspired by the movie Eternal Sunshine of the Spotless Mind.  "Oh Hello", "In Fear and Faith", and "Meet Me in Montauk" all reference lines from the film. "Wish Resign" refers to a line from the Alexander Pope poem Eloisa to Abelard, for which the movie was named.
 "The Glorious Nosebleed" is a short story by Edward Gorey.
"Stop the Fuckin' Car" may be a reference to the film Harlem Nights.
The hidden track "House of Leaves" is named after and references the book House of Leaves by Mark Z. Danielewski. After "Meet Me in Montauk" ends there is roughly five and a half minutes of silence before the hidden track begins. This may be a reference to the 5&½ Minute Hallway, a fictional film in Danielewski's book. The song may be from the perspective of the main character in the novel, Johnny Truant.

References

2005 debut albums
Circa Survive albums
Equal Vision Records albums
Albums produced by Brian McTernan